The Joseph Newburger House is a historic house in Memphis in the U.S. state of Tennessee. It was built in 1912 for Joseph Newburger, a businessman from Mississippi who was the founder of the Newburger Cotton Company as well as the president of the Memphis Packing Corporation, the Memphis Rice Mills, and the Joy Rice Milling Company. The house has been home to the Memphis Theological Seminary since 1963.

The house was designed by Hanker & Cairns in the Beaux Arts architectural style. It was listed on the National Register of Historic Places in 1982.

See also

References

External links

National Register of Historic Places in Shelby County, Tennessee
Beaux-Arts architecture in Tennessee
Houses completed in 1912